Andrzej Lech Kondratiuk (20 July 1936 – 22 June 2016) was a Polish film director, screenwriter, actor, and cinematographer.

Biography 
Kondratiuk graduated from the National Film School in Łódź in 1963.

Andrzej Kondratiuk created low-budget films, and, in scenarios, often used threads from his biography. He often selected actors and individuals from the immediate surroundings, including amateurs. Some of his films were created in Gzowo near Pułtusk.

Many of his earlier films were short etudes.

Private life 
He was the older brother of film director Janusz Kondratiuk and was married to the actress Iga Cembrzyńska.

Filmography 
 1963 – Kobiela na plaży
 1963 – Niezawodny sposób
 1965 – Monolog trębacza
 1966 – Chciałbym się ogolić
 1966 – Klub profesora Tutki
 1967 – Fluidy
 1970 – Hydrozagadka
 1970 – Dziura w ziemi
 1972 – Skorpion, Panna i Łucznik
 1972 – Dziewczyny do wzięcia 
 1973 – Wniebowzięci
 1973 – Jak to się robi
 1976 – Czy jest tu panna na wydaniu?
 1979 – Pełnia
 1982 – Gwiezdny pył
 1984 – Cztery pory roku
 1986 – Big Bang
 1990 – Mleczna droga
 1991 – Ene... due... like... fake...
 1993 – Wesoła noc smutnego biznesmena 
 1995 – Wrzeciono czasu
 1997 – Słoneczny zegar
 2000 – Pamiętnik filmowy Igi C.
 2001 – Córa marnotrawna
 2004 – Bar pod młynkiem
 2007 – Pamiętnik Andrzeja Kondratiuka
Etudes from PWSF:
 1958 – Juvenalia w Łodzi
 1958 – Zakochany Pinokio
 1959 – Dedykacja
 1959 – Noe (scenariusz z M. Kijowskim)
 1960 – Obrazki z podróży

References

External links 

 Andrzej Kondratiuk at filmweb.pl
 Andrzej Kondratiuk at filmpolski.pl
 Andrzej Kondratiuk at stopklatka.pl
 Andrzej Kondratiuk na zdjęciach at Filmoteki Narodowej "Fototeka"
 Andrzej Kondratiuk at the Akademii Polskiego Filmu

1936 births
2016 deaths
Polish cinematographers
Polish film directors
Polish screenwriters
Łódź Film School alumni
People from Pinsk
People from Polesie Voivodeship
Polish people of Belarusian descent